Polyura narcaeus, the China nawab, is a butterfly in the family Nymphalidae. It was described by William Chapman Hewitson in 1854. It is found in the Palearctic and Indomalayan realms.

Subspecies
P. n. narcaeus (China, Naga Hills, Abor Valley, North Burma)
P. n. menedemus (Oberthür, 1891) (China: Ta-tsien-lou, Moenia, Yunnan)
P. n. meghaduta (Fruhstorfer, 1908) (Taiwan)
P. n. aborica (Evans, 1924) (south-eastern Tibet, northern Assam)
P. n. thawgawa (Tytler, 1940) (central Burma to Vietnam, Yunnan)
P. n. lissainei (Tytler, 1914) (Assam: Naga Hills to Thailand)

Biology
The larva feeds on Trema orientalis, Celtis formosana, Pithecellobium lucidum, Prunus phaeosticta.

References

External links
Polyura Billberg, 1820 at Markku Savela's Lepidoptera and Some Other Life Forms

Polyura
Butterflies described in 1854